Valery Yurievich Kashuba (born 14 September 1984) is a Kyrgyzstani footballer who is a goalkeeper for Dordoi Bishkek in the Kyrgyzstan League. He is an occasional member of the Kyrgyzstan national football team. His first and only cap was a friendly match against Kuwait national football team in 2004. His most recent call up to the national team was on 18 February 2004 in a preliminary match against Tajikistan national football team for the 2006 FIFA World Cup. Kashuba was named Kyrgyzstan goalkeeper of the year in 2006.

Coaching career
In January 2022, Dordoi Bishkek announced that Kashuba had been appointed as a player-coach, and would assist the goalkeeping coaches whilst still being registered as a player at the club.

Career statistics

International

Statistics accurate as of match played 29 May 2018

Honors

Club
SKA-PVO Bishkek
Kyrgyzstan Cup (1): 2003
Dordoi Bishkek
Kyrgyzstan League (2); 2006, 2007
Kyrgyzstan Cup (1): 2006
AFC President's Cup (1): 2007
Abdish-Ata Kant
Kyrgyzstan Cup (1): 2009
Alay Osh
Kyrgyzstan League (1); 2013
Kyrgyzstan Cup (1): 2013

References

External links
Kashuba at Sport.kg
soccer.azplayers.com

1983 births
Living people
Kyrgyzstani footballers
Kyrgyzstani people of Russian descent
Kyrgyzstani expatriate footballers
FC Alga Bishkek players
FC Dordoi Bishkek players
Footballers at the 2006 Asian Games
Footballers at the 2014 Asian Games
Association football goalkeepers
2019 AFC Asian Cup players
Asian Games competitors for Kyrgyzstan
Tajikistan Higher League players
Kyrgyzstani people of Georgian descent
Kyrgyzstan international footballers